Karl or Carl Klaus or Claus may refer to:

Carl Friedrich Wilhelm Claus (1835–1899), Austrian zoologist
Karl Ernst Claus (1796–1864), Russian chemist and discoverer of ruthenium
Carl Friedrich Claus (1827–1900), German chemist and inventor
Carl Klaus (born 1994), German footballer